Stinga is a genus of skippers in the family Hesperiidae.

Species
Recognised species in the genus Stinga include:
 Stinga morrisoni (Edwards, 1878)

References

Natural History Museum Lepidoptera genus database

Hesperiini
Hesperiidae genera